Dodgingtown is a census-designated place (CDP) in the town of Newtown, Fairfield County, Connecticut, United States. It on the west side of Newtown and is bordered to the west by the town of Bethel. Connecticut Route 302 passes through the center of the community.

Dodgingtown was first listed as a CDP prior to the 2020 census.

References 

Census-designated places in Fairfield County, Connecticut
Census-designated places in Connecticut